The AHCA Coach of the Year is awarded yearly to the top coach in NCAA Division I women's college ice hockey by the American Hockey Coaches Association.

Award winners

Winners by school

Multiple Wins

References